Zac is a masculine given name, often a short form (hypocorism) of Zachary or Zechariah. It may refer to:

People:
 Zac Alexander (born 1989), Australian professional squash player
 Zac Brooks (born 1993), American National Football League player
 Zac Brown (born 1978), lead singer and guitarist of the American country music band Zac Brown Band
 Zac Clarke (born 1990), Australian rules footballer
 Zac Curtis (born 1992), American Major League Baseball pitcher
 Zac Dalpe (born 1989), Canadian National Hockey League player
 Zac Dawson (born 1986), Australian rules footballer
 Zac Dysert (born 1990), American National Football League quarterback
 Zac Efron (born 1987), American actor and singer
 Zac Elkin (born 1991), South African cricketer
 Zac Evans (born 1991), Welsh footballer
 Zac Goldsmith (born 1975), British Conservative politician and journalist
 Zac Guildford (born 1989), New Zealand rugby union player
 Zac Hanson (born 1985), American musician, best known as a member of the pop rock band Hanson
 Zac Henderson (1955–2020), American former National Football League and Canadian Football League player
 Zac Holtzman, American guitarist and co-founder of the band Dengue Fever
 Zac Kerin (born 1991), American National Football League player
 Zac Lubin (born 1989), American soccer player
 Zac MacMath (born 1991), American soccer player
 Zac Morris (born 1978), English former cricketer
 Zac Posen (born 1980), American fashion designer
 Zac Rinaldo (born 1990), Canadian ice hockey player
 Zac Rosscup (born 1988), American Major League Baseball pitcher
 Zac Santo (born 1993), Australian rugby league footballer
 Zac Smith (born 1990), Australian rules footballer
 Zac Sunderland (born 1991), American sailor, first person under the age of 18 to sail solo around the world
 Zac Taylor (born 1983), American football coach and former quarterback
 Zac Williams (cyclist) (born 1995), New Zealand cyclist
 Zac Zorn (born 1947), American former swimmer

Fictional characters:
 Zac MacGuire in the Australian soap opera Home and Away
 Zac Smith (Shortland Street) in the New Zealand soap opera Shortland Street
 Zac (Battlestar Galactica) in the original Battlestar Galactica TV series
 Zac (Shimmer and Shine), in the TV series Shimmer and Shine
 Zac, the Secret Weapon, a playable character in multiplayer online battle arena video game League of Legends

See also
 Zach or* Zack (disambiguation)

Masculine given names
Hypocorisms